Kalpana, Inc., was a computer-networking equipment manufacturer located in Silicon Valley which operated during the 1980s and 1990s. Its co-founders, Vinod Bhardwaj, an entrepreneur of Indian origin, and Larry Blair named the company after Bhardwaj's wife, Kalpana, whose name means "imagination" in Sanskrit.  Charles Giancarlo was Kalpana's vice president of products and corporate development, became its General Manager, and went on to roles at Cisco Systems and Silver Lake Partners.

In 1989 and 1990, Kalpana introduced the first multiport Ethernet switch, its seven-port EtherSwitch.  The invention of Ethernet switching made Ethernet networks faster, cheaper, and easier to manage.  Multi-port network switches became common, gradually replacing Ethernet hubs for almost all applications, and enabled an easy transition to 100-megabit Fast Ethernet and later Gigabit Ethernet.  Kalpana also invented EtherChannel, which provides higher inter-switch bandwidth by running several links in parallel.  This innovation, more generally called link aggregation, was also widely adopted throughout the industry.  Kalpana also invented the Virtual LAN concept as closed broadcast domains, which was later replaced by 802.1Q.

Cisco Systems acquired Kalpana in 1994.

Product
Kalpana produced two models of Ethernet switch, the EPS-700 and the EPS-1500.

See also 

 List of acquisitions by Cisco

References 

1987 establishments in California
1994 disestablishments in California
1994 mergers and acquisitions
American companies established in 1987
American companies disestablished in 1994
Cisco Systems acquisitions
Computer companies established in 1987
Computer companies disestablished in 1994
Defunct computer companies of the United States
Defunct computer hardware companies
Defunct networking companies
Networking hardware companies